Maxime Machenaud (born 30 December 1988) is a French rugby union player. His position is scrum-half and he currently plays for Bayonne and formerly of the France national team.

Club career
Born in Bordeaux, he trained at Stade Bordelais and as a youth at the CABBG (Athletic Club Bordeaux Bègles Gironde). He began his career with home-town club Bordeaux Bègles in the Pro D2, before moving to SU Agen in the Top 14 in 2010. In 2012 he joined Racing Métro. In the final of the 2015–16 Top 14 season Machenaud picked up an early red card for a tackle on Matt Giteau, however Racing still went on to defeat Toulon.

International career
He made his international debut during France's 2012 tour of Argentina, during which he scored his first international try.

In November 2022, he was called up for the French Barbarians to face Fiji at the Stade Pierre-Mauroy.

International tries

Honours
 Racing 92
Top 14: 2015–16

References

External links
France profile at FFR
Racing 92 profile
ESPN profile

1988 births
Living people
French rugby union players
Sportspeople from Bordeaux
Racing 92 players
Aviron Bayonnais players
Rugby union scrum-halves
France international rugby union players